Wood-free paper is paper created exclusively from chemical pulp rather than mechanical pulp. Chemical pulp is normally made from  pulpwood, but is not considered wood as most of the lignin is removed and separated from the cellulose fibers during processing, whereas mechanical pulp retains most of its wood components and can therefore still be described as wood. Wood-free paper is not as susceptible to yellowing as paper containing mechanical pulp.

See also
Coated fine paper
Woodfree uncoated paper
Tree-free paper

References

Paper
Sustainable products
Deforestation